Petrophile aculeata is a species of flowering plant in the family Proteaceae and is endemic to southwestern Western Australia. It is a small shrub with narrow egg-shaped leaves with the narrower end towards the base and with irregular teeth near the end, and more or less spherical heads of hairy yellow flowers.

Description
The flowers are arranged in sessile, more or less spherical heads  in diameter, with hairy grey involucral bracts at the base.

Taxonomy
Petrophile aculeata was first formally described in 1995 by Donald Bruce Foreman in Flora of Australia. The specific epithet (aculeata) means "prickly", referring to "the prickly appearance and feel of the specimens".

Distribution and habitat
This petrophile grows in low heath in the Alexander Morrison National Park near Coorow and in a separate population south of Eneabba where it grows in sandy soils over laterite in the Avon Wheatbelt and Geraldton Sandplains biogeographic regions of southwestern Western Australia.

Conservation status
Petrophile aculeata is classified as "not threatened" by the Western Australian Government Department of Parks and Wildlife.

References

aculeata
Eudicots of Western Australia
Endemic flora of Western Australia
Plants described in 1995